Eddie Dunn may refer to:

Eddie Dunn (actor) (1896–1951), American actor
Eddie Dunn (American football) (1915–1980), American football coach
Eddie Dunn (rugby union) (born 1955), New Zealand rugby union footballer